The 79th New York State Legislature, consisting of the New York State Senate and the New York State Assembly, met from January 1 to April 9, 1856, during the second year of Myron H. Clark's governorship, in Albany.

Background
Under the provisions of the New York Constitution of 1846, 32 Senators were elected in single-seat senatorial districts for a two-year term, the whole Senate being renewed biennially. The senatorial districts (except those in New York City) were made up of entire counties. 128 Assemblymen were elected in single-seat districts to a one-year term, the whole Assembly being renewed annually. The Assembly districts were made up of entire towns, or city wards, forming a contiguous area, all in the same county. The City and County of New York was divided into four senatorial districts, and 16 Assembly districts.

At this time there the Democratic Party was split into two factions: the Hard-Shells (or Hards) and the Soft-Shells (or Softs). In 1848, the Democratic Party had been split into Barnburners and Hunkers. The Barnburners left the party, and ran as the Free Soil Party, with presidential candidate Martin Van Buren. Afterwards the larger part of the Free Soilers re-joined the Democratic Party. During the following years, the Hunkers split over the question of reconciliation with the Barnburners. The Hards were against it, denying the Barnburners to gain influence in the Party. The Softs favored reconciliation with the intention of maintaining enough strength to win the elections. Both Hards and Softs favored a compromise on the slavery question: to maintain the status quo and to leave the decision to the local population in new Territories or States if they want slavery or not, as expressed in the Kansas-Nebraska Act.

The anti-slavery faction of the Whig Party, the "Free Democrats" (former Barnburners and Free Soilers), and the short-lived Anti-Nebraska Party merged into the Republican Party.

Most of the Whigs which favored a compromise, or preferred to sidestep the issue, joined with parts of the Democratic factions the Know Nothing movement which ran in the election as the "American Party."

Elections
The New York state election, 1855 was held on November 6. Due to the re-alignment of political parties, the whole American Party ticket of State officers was elected. The approximate party strength at this election, as expressed by the vote on Secretary of State was: American 148,000; Republican 137,000; Soft 91,000; and Hard 59,000.

Sessions
The Legislature met for the regular session at the Old State Capitol in Albany on January 1, 1856; and adjourned on April 9.

On January 16, after two weeks of deadlock, Orville Robinson (D) was elected Speaker on the 49th ballot.

On January 29, Alonzo S. Upham (R) was elected president pro tempore of the State Senate.

State Senate

Districts

 1st District: Queens, Richmond and Suffolk counties
 2nd District: Kings County
 3rd District: 1st, 2nd, 3rd, 4th, 5th and 6th wards of New York City
 4th District: 7th, 10th, 13th and 17th wards of New York City
 5th District: 8th, 9th and 14th wards of New York City
 6th District: 11th, 12th, 15th, 16th, 18th, 19th, 20th, 21st and 22nd wards of New York City
 7th District: Putnam,  Rockland and Westchester counties
 8th District: Columbia and Dutchess counties
 9th District: Orange and Sullivan counties
 10th District: Greene and Ulster counties
 11th District: Albany and Schenectady counties
 12th District: Rensselaer County
 13th District: Saratoga and Washington counties
 14th District: Clinton, Essex and Warren counties
 15th District: Franklin and St. Lawrence counties
 16th District: Fulton, Hamilton, Herkimer and Montgomery counties
 17th District: Delaware and Schoharie counties
 18th District: Chenango and Otsego counties
 19th District: Oneida County
 20th District: Madison and Oswego counties
 21st District: Jefferson and Lewis counties
 22nd District: Onondaga County
 23rd District: Broome, Cortland and Tioga counties
 24th District: Cayuga and Wayne counties
 25th District: Seneca, Tompkins and Yates counties
 26th District: Chemung and Steuben counties
 27th District: Monroe County
 28th District: Genesee, Niagara and Orleans counties
 29th District: Livingston and Ontario counties
 30th District: Allegany and Wyoming counties
 31st District: Erie County
 32nd District: Cattaraugus and Chautauqua counties

Note: There are now 62 counties in the State of New York. The counties which are not mentioned in this list had not yet been established, or sufficiently organized, the area being included in one or more of the abovementioned counties.

Members
The asterisk (*) denotes members of the previous Legislature who continued in office as members of this Legislature. Mark Spencer, Erastus Brooks, Zenas Clark and George W. Bradford were re-elected. James Rider, Joseph H. Petty, John W. Ferdon, Justin A. Smith and Joseph H. Ramsey changed from the Assembly to the Senate.

Party affiliations follow the vote on Senate and State officers.

Employees
 Clerk: Samuel P. Allen
 Sergeant-at-Arms: Samuel R. Tuell
 Assistant Sergeant-at-Arms: George W. Bedell
 Doorkeeper: William Coppernall
 Assistant Doorkeeper: Henry W. Shipman
 Second Assistant Doorkeeper: Victor M. Dearborn

State Assembly

Assemblymen
The asterisk (*) denotes members of the previous Legislature who continued as members of this Legislature.

Party affiliations follow the vote on Speaker.

Employees
 Clerk: Richard U. Sherman
 Sergeant-at-Arms: George B. Woolbridge
 Doorkeeper: Sherman McLean
 First Assistant Doorkeeper: John Davies
 Second Assistant Doorkeeper: Henry White

Notes

Sources
 The New York Civil List compiled by Franklin Benjamin Hough (Weed, Parsons and Co., 1858) [pg. 109 for Senate districts; pg. 137 for senators; pg. 148–157 for Assembly districts; pg. 250ff for assemblymen]
 Journal of the Senate (79th Session) (1856)
 Journal of the Assembly (79th Session) (1856)

079
1856 in New York (state)
1856 U.S. legislative sessions